Portion control may refer to:

 Portion Control (band), the 1980s electronic music band
 Portion control (dieting), a method of limiting caloric intake